Pearl Fey, known as  in the original Japanese language versions and Chūnměi Línglǐ in the Chinese language version, is a fictional spirit medium in Capcom's Ace Attorney video game series. Pearl is featured as the main support character to the protagonist Phoenix Wright in the second game of the series, and later returns in the third, fifth, and sixth games. The character has also appeared in anime and manga adaptations of the series, and one of the series of stage plays, and crossover video games such as Teppen and We Love Golf!.

Pearl was created by Shu Takumi, the creator and director of the series, as he wanted a rival character to the first game's main support character Maya Fey, redeveloped as the character's eight-year-old cousin on suggestion of Tatsuro Iwamoto. For her design, she was given traditional clothing for Japanese spirit mediums evocative of Maya's design, including a kimono and a magatama bead. When she was brought back for Dual Destinies and Spirit of Justice, she was written the same way as in her first appearances. Critics praised her character and her interactions with Phoenix and Maya in the original trilogy, and her return in the fifth and sixth games was well received, although criticized for the lack of character development.

Appearances
Pearl first appears in Phoenix Wright: Ace Attorney – Justice for All, where she is introduced as the sheltered younger cousin of spirit medium and investigative assistant Maya Fey and a member of the Fey clan, a family of spirit mediums living in the isolated mountain town of Kurain Village. A spirit medium herself, after her mother Morgan Fey attempts to have Maya framed for murder in order to have Pearl succeed Maya as the Master of Kurain, Pearl channels her deceased cousin and defense attorney Mia Fey so she can guide Phoenix Wright in clearing her cousin's name and exposing Morgan's crimes. Afterwards, Pearl often accompanies Phoenix and Maya, whom she views as each holding romantic interest towards the other (as their "special someone"), because of her sheltered upbringing. At one point, they take Pearl to the Berry Big Circus. Nine months after her mother's arrest, Pearl, Maya and Phoenix are invited to an awards show at the Gatewater Imperial Hotel, where Maya is kidnapped by notorious hired hitman Shelly de Killer and Phoenix is made to defend his employer Matt Engarde and have him receive a "not guilty" verdict as ransom. Pearl and Maya subsequently each separately channel Mia to allow her to pass information about where Maya is being held to Phoenix, allowing them to turn De Killer against Engarde during his trial and have Engarde plead "guilty", allowing for Maya's release. Pearl additionally displays her athletic abilities in being able to run from the mountaintop Kurain Village to Los Angeles in under five hours, a distance taking two hours to travel by train.

Pearl returns in Phoenix Wright: Ace Attorney – Trials and Tribulations, seeing the Sacred Urn she had previously broken displayed at a department store, before it is stolen by the infamous thief Mask☆DeMasque, a.k.a. Ron DeLite. After Phoenix clears Ron of both his true theft charges and untrue murder charges, Ron's wife Desirée hugs him, leading to Pearl, having just arrived on the scene, knocking Phoenix out, after mistakenly believing him to have been cheating on Maya. Sometime later, after visiting her mother in prison and travelling with Phoenix and Maya to a mountain retreat, Pearl is tricked by her mother into attempting to channel her deceased half-sister Dahlia Hawthorne to have her kill Maya, only to be saved by her aunt, Misty Fey, who had disappeared many years prior, and Mia's former boyfriend Godot, who had been rendered comatose many years prior. Later, while Pearl's other half-sister Iris is accused of Misty's murder, Pearl confronts Franziska von Karma over her poor treatment of Maya, rendering her speechless, before once again channeling Mia to help Phoenix in court. In the aftermath of the trial, Pearl returns to the temple in tears to clean up gravy she had spilled on Misty's portrait; Phoenix and Maya then catch up with her, reassuring her that she is not to blame for the events that occurred.

Pearl does not make a physical appearance in the series' fourth entry; however, she is briefly referenced in dialogue by Phoenix in Apollo Justice: Ace Attorney. By Phoenix Wright: Ace Attorney – Dual Destinies, set eight years after Trials and Tribulations, Pearl is a high school student, regularly keeping in touch with Phoenix and his legally adopted daughter Trucy Wright, who sees her as her "big sister." After Phoenix's new protégé Athena Cykes is arrested, Pearl visits Phoenix on her regular route to clean his office and deliver him a letter from Maya, before accompanying him in proving Athena innocent of her mother's murder, and comforts Athena after Phoenix breaks the black Psyche-Locks on her subconscious mind, representing repressed memories of secrets. In the game's DLC case, set several months earlier, Pearl is visiting Shipshape Aquarium with her summer camp before being questioned by police after the aquarium's owner is apparently murdered. Subsequently, Pearl runs into Phoenix and Athena, introducing herself to the latter before recharging Phoenix's magatama, it having finally run out of spiritual energy after she had first charged it for him upon meeting him nine years prior. After an orca and subsequently their trainer are accused of the murder, Pearl assists Phoenix and Athena in their investigation, retrieving forensics equipment Phoenix had previously received from Ema Skye. Months after the trial's conclusion (the death having been proven to be accidental in nature), Pearl revisits the aquarium with Phoenix, Athena, Trucy, and Apollo Justice.

In Phoenix Wright: Ace Attorney – Spirit of Justice, Pearl briefly appears in Kurain Village after Apollo visits it with his deceased adoptive father Dhurke Sahdmadhi (channeled by Maya), providing them with directions to a cave they were searching for. After Maya finally returns from her medium studies in the Kingdom of Khura'in, she is greeted by Pearl, who unsuccessfully pitches the concept of allowing clothing stores to set up in the town. In the non-canon DLC case Asinine Attorney, Pearl appears on vacation in the Kingdom of Khu'rain, briefly impersonating royal priestess Rayfa Padma Khura'in to prevent them from being kidnapped.

Other appearances
Outside of the main Ace Attorney series, Pearl makes a brief cameo appearance in the Ace Attorney Investigations: Miles Edgeworth spin-off title, also appearing in several other Capcom titles, including as an unlockable costume in We Love Golf! and as a collectible card in Teppen: Ace vs. The People.

Pearl has appeared in other media adaptations of Ace Attorney. She is a recurring character in the Ace Attorney manga series published by Kodansha Comics, and in a stage play based on the case Farewell, My Turnabout, portrayed by Shiyū Urushibara with understudy Yūna Takano. Pearl also appears in the Ace Attorney anime series, which adapts the events of the original trilogy.

Concept and development
Ace Attorney series creator and director Shu Takumi conceived of Pearl as a "snooty rival" for Maya who would only appear in the second case of Justice For All. However, after Tatsuro Iwamoto suggested that the character much younger to add to the case's drama, Takumi found the resulting character "adorable", writing her into the other episodes of the game. The kanji for her Japanese surname, Ayasato is written with the characters for "twill" and "village", while her given name Harumi contains the kanji for "spring" and "beauty".

Localization
Starting with the second game, the localization direction was handled by Janet Hsu; one of the first decisions she had to make was how to localize Kurain Village and the Fey clan. She decided to localize it around the idea that Ace Attorney takes place in an alternative-universe United States where anti-Japanese laws like the California Alien Land Law of 1913 were not passed, anti-Japanese sentiments were not powerful, and Japanese culture flourished. Because of this, the Fey clan and things related to it, such as the Kurain channeling technique, were kept Japanese as it was seen as part of Pearl's and Maya's heritage. Her English given name "Pearl" is based on the character of the same name from the novel The Scarlet Letter by Nathaniel Hawthorne.

Design
Along with the rest of the second game's characters, Pearl was designed and drawn by Kumiko Suekane and Tatsuro Iwamoto. She was designed with a variant of the clothes worn by her cousin Maya and the rest of the Fey Clan, typical for traditional Japanese spirit mediums, including a kimono and a magatama bead; the kimono design was altered compared to the source material, however, with the hem drastically shortened. Like with Maya, in situations when Pearl channels Mia's spirit, her design changes: her hair and clothing remains, while her face and body change, looking like Mia's, with the intent of emphasizing the difference in their bust sizes. Unlike Maya or Mia, Peal was additionally designed to express her emotions openly and freely. For Pearl's reappearance in Dual Destinies and Spirit of Justice, she was given a subtly renewed design, consisting of slightly longer hair, and an extra bead; before settling on the final version, the development team considered using a radical redesign, including a different hairstyle and colour scheme.

Reception
Pearl was received well by critics, especially for her comic relief, cuteness, and naivety throughout the series. The Outerhaven described Pearl as "[o]ne of the biggest additions to the series", ranking them as the seventh-best character in the series, while Nintendo Life praised Pearl as a character who "doesn't get taken seriously because of [her]  vaguely twee, childlike nature — and yet can [take down criminals] the same as any other [girl], just as Pearl can help Phoenix and Apollo". Pearl was also well received in the anime adaptation. Reviewing "Hear the Waves of Turnabout", Erich Hau of Bubble Blabber stated: "The emotional core of this episode lies entirely within Pearl, a character who doesn't get a whole lot of screen time in the grand scheme of things. Yet, Pearl is easily one of the most likable characters in the show, (When she's not breaking things, that is) which is well demonstrated here. Curious, kind and filled with a sense of adventure, Pearl is the center of this story. By the end of it, the audience develops a deeper bond with her as a character, as we see just why she loves her cousin Maya so much."

Reviewers criticized Pearl's characterization in the fifth and sixth Ace Attorney games, deeming her too similar to her appearance in the original trilogy despite being eight years older.

References

Ace Attorney characters
Female characters in anime and manga
Female characters in video games
Fictional characters from Los Angeles
Fictional Japanese American people
Fictional runners
Fictional spiritual mediums
Video game characters introduced in 2002
Video game sidekicks